

Butterflies

Moths

A-E

F-M

N-O

P-Z

External links
Fauna Europaea

Austria, lepidop
Lepidop
Austri
 Austria